= Maurice Zeeman =

American toxicologist

- Scientific career
- Fields: Toxicology

Maurice G. Zeeman is an American toxicologist who worked for the Environmental Protection Agency as chief of the Environmental Effects branch. He also represented the US at the OECD, and chaired their Working Group of the National Co-ordinators of the Test Guidelines Programme (WNT), stepping down in 2004.

He is an Elected Fellow of the American Association for the Advancement of Science.
